Julia Adolfs (24 September 1899 – 16 November 1975) was the first woman to pass her law examinations in the Dutch East Indies. She began to practice in 1927 and gained a reputation for practicing criminal law. Acting as an attorney for Chinese clients and Royal Dutch Shell she became prominent, investing her earnings in rental properties. When Indonesia gained independence, her properties were nationalized and she eventually moved to Amsterdam. A scholarship bearing her name is presented by the University of Amsterdam as a research grant for law students.

Early life
Julia Henriëtte Adolfs was born on 24 January 1899 in Semarang, Dutch East Indies to Henriëtte (née Donkel) and Cornelis Gerardus Adolfs, as one of eight children. Her older brother Gerard, known as "Ger" would become a renowned painter. Her father, a native of Amsterdam, was tall and blond. He had a degree in architecture and was known for his skill as an amateur painter, photographer and musician. Her mother's family, of Javanese ancestry, owned a livestock breeding farm. After completing her primary and secondary education in Java, Adolfs wrote to distant relatives in the Netherlands hoping they could help her to continue her education. With their help, she enrolled in Leiden University, and completed her doctoral examination to practice law in the Dutch East Indies in 1926.

Career
Adolfs returned to Java, as the first woman lawyer of the colony. In March 1927, she joined the law firm in Surabaya operated by Sytze Jaarsma. Five months later Adolfs and Jaarsma married and they would subsequently have three daughters. Jaarsma preferred the study of law and his casework often centered on the fundamental rights of Europeans in the colony. Adolfs on the other hand preferred the practice of law. Though she argued cases on family, inheritance, or real estate law, her specialty was criminal law. She defended some of the most notorious criminals in the port city and had many Chinese clients. Newspapers reported that the two lawyers who made a name for themselves at the time litigating on behalf of Chinese businessmen were Adolfs and Victor Ploegman. Because of the nature of her work and the numerous Chinese artifacts which adorned her home, it was often rumored that she participated in smuggling and took a percentage of the earnings of her clients' gains. A former judge who often worked with Adolfs wrote in 1972 that "She was certainly a major criminal lawyer and the best I met during my long career of almost half a century".

By the early 1930s, Adolfs also served as a public prosecutor in the Supreme Court of Justice of Surabaya and had an established record as a lawyer for Royal Dutch Shell. Using the profits from her work, she invested in rental properties, amassing 110 units prior to Indonesian Independence. During the Japanese occupation of the Dutch East Indies during the Second World War, the family were imprisoned for three and a half years in various internment camps. After the Japanese withdrew, the family home was in the center of intense fighting during the Bersiap and Adolfs and Jaarsma sent their daughters to safety to attend school in the Netherlands. When the Indonesian National Revolution ended in independence for Indonesia, Adolfs' properties were nationalized. Long after other Dutch citizens had left Java, and even after her husband's death in 1959, Adolfs remained in Surabaya filing mostly unsuccessful claims to restore her property.

Later life and legacy
In 1961, Adolfs finally left Indonesia and reunited with her daughters in the Netherlands. In 2015, when Adolfs' last surviving daughter, Trudie Vervoort-Jaarsma died, she bequeathed €4 million of the combined family capital to the University of Amsterdam in the name of her mother and her own daughter, Madeleine Vervoort. It was the largest single bequest left to a Dutch university by a private citizen. The scholarship fund named after Adolfs is a research grant for the law faculty, while the fund named after Vervoort is a travel grant, in recognition that attaining an education often requires collecting data in various locations.

References

Citations

Bibliography

1899 births
1975 deaths
People from Semarang
Leiden University alumni
Dutch women lawyers
Indonesian women lawyers
Dutch people of Javanese descent
Indo people
Javanese people
Indonesian emigrants to the Netherlands
20th-century Dutch lawyers
Indonesian people of Dutch descent
20th-century Dutch East Indies people
20th-century women lawyers
20th-century Dutch women
20th-century Dutch people
20th-century Indonesian lawyers